Dutchess County is a county in the U.S. state of New York. As of the 2020 census, the population was 295,911. The county seat is the city of Poughkeepsie. The county was created in 1683, one of New York's first twelve counties, and later organized in 1713. It is located in the Mid-Hudson Region of the Hudson Valley, north of New York City.

Dutchess County is part of the Poughkeepsie–Newburgh–Middletown Metropolitan Statistical Area, which belongs to the larger New York–Newark–Bridgeport, NY-NJ-CT-PA Combined Statistical Area.

History

Before Anglo-Dutch settlement, what is today Dutchess County was a leading center for the indigenous Wappinger peoples. They had their council-fire at what is now Fishkill Hook, and had settlements throughout the area.

On November 1, 1683, the Province of New York established its first twelve counties, including Dutchess. Its boundaries at that time included the present Putnam County, and a small portion of the present Columbia County (the towns of Clermont and Germantown). The county was named for Mary of Modena, Duchess of York;  is an archaic spelling of the word duchess.

The eastern half of the stub of land in northeast Dutchess County containing Rudd Pond and Taconic State Park is the northernmost extension of The Oblong.

Until 1713, Dutchess was administered by Ulster County. On October 23, 1713, Queen Anne gave permission for Dutchess County to elect its own officers from among their own population, including a supervisor, tax collector, tax assessor and treasurer. In 2013, Dutchess County celebrated its 300th anniversary of democracy based upon a legislative resolution sponsored by County Legislator Michael Kelsey from Salt Point. In 1812, Putnam County was detached from Dutchess.

The Patents

Fourteen royal land patents were granted between 1685 and 1706 covering the entirety of the original footprint of Dutchess County (which until 1812 included today's Putnam County).

The first ten, granted between 1685 and 1697, covered almost all of Hudson River shoreline in the original county, with three - Rombouts, the Great Nine Partners, and Philipse Patents - extending significantly inland. The eleventh, and smallest, Cuyler, 1697, was the first to contain solely inland territory, just in from the Hudson. The twelfth, and next smallest, Fauconnier, in 1705, completed the Hudson River shoreline.  The last two, Beekman, 1705, and the Little Nine Partners, 1706, laid claim to the remaining interior lands.

 1685 Rombout (Beacon/Fishkill Area)
 1686 Minnisinck (Sanders & Harmense)
 1686 Kip
 1688 Schuyler (Poughkeepsie)
 1688 Schuyler (Red Hook)
 1688 Ærtsen-Roosa-Elton
 1696 Pawling-Staats
 1697 Rhinebeck
 1697 (Great) Nine Partners
 1697 Philipse
 1697 Cuyler
 1705 Fauconnier
 1705 Beekman (Back Lots)
 1706 (Little) Nine Partners

Early settlement
From 1683 to 1715, most of the settlers in Dutchess County were Dutch.  Many of these moved in from Albany and Ulster counties.  They settled along the Fishkill Creek and in the areas that are now Poughkeepsie and Rhinebeck.

From 1715 to 1730, most of the new settlers in Dutchess county were Germans.  From 1730 until 1775, New Englanders were the primary new settlers in Dutchess County.

20th century
Franklin D. Roosevelt lived in his family home in Hyde Park, overlooking the Hudson River. His family's home is now the Home of Franklin D. Roosevelt National Historic Site, managed by the National Park Service.

Prior to the 1960s, Dutchess County was primarily agricultural. Since then the southwestern part (from Poughkeepsie southward and from the Taconic State Parkway westward) of the county has developed into a largely residential area, suburban in character, with many of its residents commuting to jobs in New York City and Westchester County. The northern and eastern regions of the county remain rural with large farmlands but at the same time developed residences used during the summer and or on weekends by people living in the New York City urban area.

Geography

Dutchess County is located in southeastern New York State, between the Hudson River on its west and the New York–Connecticut border on its east, about halfway between the cities of Albany and New York City. It contains two cities: Beacon and Poughkeepsie.

The terrain of the county is mostly hilly, especially in the Hudson Highlands in the southwestern corner and the Taconic Mountains to the northeast. Some areas nearer the river are flatter.

The highest point in the county is the summit of Brace Mountain, in the Taconics, at 2,311 feet (704 m) above sea level. The lowest point is sea level, along the Hudson River. The highest point of neighboring Fairfield County, Connecticut, is a  point along the state line in Pawling.

Its  watershed is likewise the largest in the county. To its south is the  watershed of Dutchess County's second-longest stream,  Fishkill Creek, part of which spills over into Putnam County. Within that watershed are the county's third-longest stream, Sprout Creek, and its largest, deepest and highest lakes: Whaley, in the town of Pawling; Sylvan in the town of Beekman and Beacon Reservoir, in the town of Fishkill, at  respectively.

Other, smaller tributaries of the Hudson such as the Saw Kill drain the northwestern portion of the county. The southeastern fringe of Dutchess is part of the upper Croton River watershed and thus part of the New York City water supply system. On the east, in the Oblong, streams drain into the Housatonic River in adjacent Connecticut.

A border nearly one-half mile (800 m) long exists with Berkshire County, Massachusetts, in the extreme northern end of the county.

Adjacent counties
 Columbia County – north
 Berkshire County, Massachusetts – northeast
 Litchfield County, Connecticut – east
 Fairfield County, Connecticut – southeast
 Putnam County – south
 Orange County – southwest
 Ulster County – west

National protected areas
 Appalachian Trail, crosses county from Putnam County line in East Fishkill to Connecticut state line near Wingdale; corridor is partly on federally protected land.
 Eleanor Roosevelt National Historic Site
 Great Thicket National Wildlife Refuge, one of six discontiguous parcels in Dover
 Home of Franklin D. Roosevelt National Historic Site
 Vanderbilt Mansion National Historic Site

State, county, and town parks

 Bowdoin County Park
 Fahnestock State Park (shared with Putnam County)
 Hudson Highlands State Park (shared with Putnam and Westchester counties)
 Stratt Town Park
 Wilcox County Park
 Tymor Forest
 Taconic State Park
 Beekman Rec
 East Fishkill Rec
 James Baird State Park
 Poughkeepsie Bridge (Walkway over the Hudson)
 Dover Stone Church
 Carnwath Farms Historic Site & Park
 Roosevelt Farm Lane
 Stony Kill Farm
 Mills–Norrie State Park
 Staatsburgh State Historic Site
 Tivoli Bays Unique Area

Privately protected open space
Mary Flagler Cary Arboretum
Ferncliff Forest
Innisfree Garden
Pawling Nature Preserve
Poets' Walk Park
Thompson Pond and neighboring Stissing Mountain

Demographics

2020 census

2000 census
As of the census of 2000, there were 280,150 people, 99,536 households, and 69,177 families residing in the county. There were 106,103 housing units at an average density of 132 per square mile (51/km2).  22.0% of the population was of Italian, 16.9% Irish, 11.3% German and 6.7% English ancestry according to Census 2000. 88.3% spoke English and 4.8% spoke Spanish.

Based on the Census Ancestry tallies, including people who listed more than one ancestry, Italians were the largest group in Dutchess County with 60,645.  Irish came in a very close second at 59,991.  In third place were the 44,915 Germans who barely exceeded the 44,078 people not in the 105 specifically delineated ancestry groups.

There were 99,536 households, out of which 34.5% had children under the age of 18 living with them, 55.5% were married couples living together, 10.3% had a female householder with no husband present, and 30.5% were non-families. 24.6% of all households were made up of individuals, and 9.0% had someone living alone who was 65 years of age or older. The average household size was 2.63 and the average family size was 3.16.

As of Q4 2021, the median home value in Dutchess County was $365,199, an increase of 13.8% from the prior year.

In the county, the age distribution of the population shows 25.1% under the age of 18, 9.4% from 18 to 24, 30.2% from 25 to 44, 23.2% from 45 to 64, and 12.0% who were 65 years of age or older. The median age was 37 years. For every 100 females, there were 100.1 males. For every 100 females age 18 and over, there were 98.2 males.

The median income for a household in the county was $53,086, and the median income for a family was $63,254. Males had a median income of $45,576 versus $30,706 for females. The per capita income for the county was $23,940. About 5.0% of families and 7.5% of the population were below the poverty line, including 8.5% of those under age 18 and 6.5% of those age 65 or over.

The decrease in population between 1810 and 1820 was due to the separation of Putnam County from Dutchess in 1812.

Racial demographics 
As of 2017, the residents of Dutchess County were reported as the following: American Indian and Alaska Native (0.04%), Asian (4%), Black or African American (8.5%), Hispanic or Latino (12.5%), Native Hawaiian and Other Pacific Islander (0.016%), Some Other Race (0.35%), Two or More Races (3%), White (71%).

Government 

Dutchess County has a Charter Government with a County Executive and directly elected legislature of 25 members, each elected from a single member district. The Charter form of Government went in to effect in 1968 given the favorable outcome of a 1967 special election dedicated to the question. From 1713 until 1967, the County Government had been managed by a Board of Supervisors, made up of the locally elected leaders.

Elections

|}

The composition of the County Legislature is 16 Republicans, 8 Democrats and 1 Conservative for the 2021–2023 term. County elections occur in odd-numbered years.

Historically, Dutchess County, like most of the lower Hudson, was classic "Yankee Republican" territory. Between 1884 and 2004, the Republican presidential candidate carried Dutchess County in 28 out of 30 elections (1964 and 1996 being exceptions). As a measure of how Republican the county was during this time, Hyde Park resident Franklin D. Roosevelt lost Dutchess County (but won New York) during his four successful bids for president.

The Republican edge narrowed significantly in the 1990s, with George H. W. Bush going from 61 percent of the county's vote in 1988 to only 40.5 percent in 1992, although that likely was affected by the presence of Ross Perot on the ballot as a third-party candidate.  In 2008, Barack Obama became only the third Democrat to carry the county since 1884, and the first to win a majority since Lyndon Johnson in 1964. It has gone for the Democratic candidate in four consecutive elections (2008, 2012, 2016, and 2020).

Dutchess County is split between two congressional districts. The most southern portion is in the 17th district, represented by Republican Mike Lawler. The rest of the county is in the 18th district, represented by Democrat Pat Ryan. These are considered "swing" districts nationally, with Cook Partisan Voting Index ratings of D+3 and D+1, respectively, as of 2022.

Law enforcement
The Cities of Beacon and Poughkeepsie; Towns of Fishkill, Hyde Park, Pine Plains, Poughkeepsie, Rhinebeck, Red Hook, and East Fishkill; and Villages of Millerton, Wappingers Falls, Millbrook, have their own Police departments. The remainder of the county is patrolled by the Dutchess County Sheriff's Office and New York State Police.  The New York State Police Troop K headquarters is located in Millbrook.

Communities
N.B.: Cities, Towns and Villages are official political designations.

Cities
 Beacon
 Poughkeepsie (county seat)

Towns

 Amenia
 Beekman
 Clinton
 Dover
 East Fishkill
 Fishkill
 Hyde Park
 La Grange
 Milan
 North East
 Pawling
 Pine Plains
 Pleasant Valley
 Poughkeepsie
 Red Hook
 Rhinebeck
 Stanford
 Union Vale
 Wappinger
 Washington

Villages

 Fishkill
 Millbrook
 Millerton
 Pawling
 Red Hook
 Rhinebeck
 Tivoli
 Wappingers Falls

Census-designated places

 Amenia
 Arlington
 Bard College
 Barrytown
 Brinckerhoff
 Chelsea Cove
 Crown Heights
 Dover Plains
 Fairview
 Freedom Plains
 Haviland
 Hillside Lake
 Hopewell Junction
 Hyde Park
 MacDonnell Heights
 Marist College
 Merritt Park
 Myers Corner
 New Hackensack
 New Hamburg
 Pine Plains
 Pleasant Valley
 Red Oaks Mill
 Rhinecliff
 Salt Point
 Shorehaven
 Spackenkill
 Staatsburg
 Titusville
 Upper Red Hook
 Vassar College
 Wassaic
 Wingdale

Hamlets

 Annandale-on-Hudson
 Arthursburg
 Attlebury
 Bangall
 Barnegat
 Castle Point
 De Witt Mills
 Fishkill Plains
 Glenham
 Gretna
 Holmes
 Hopewell Junction
 Hortontown
 Hughsonville
 Johnsontown
 Knapps Corner
 Lithgow
 Lomala
 Mabbettsville
 McIntyre
 Millbrook
 Norrie Heights
 Pecksville
 Pleasant Plains
 Poughquag
 Quaker Hill
 Rudco
 Shenandoah
 Shekomeko
 Staatsburg
 Stanfordville
 Stissing
 Stormville
 Swartwoutville
 Van Keurens
 Verbank
 Wiccopee
 Willow Brook

Education

Public school districts 

 Arlington Central School District
 Beacon City School District
 Dover Union Free School District
 Hyde Park Central School District
 Millbrook Central School District
 Pawling Central School District
 Pine Plains Central School District
 Poughkeepsie City School District
 Red Hook Central School District
 Rhinebeck Central School District
 Spackenkill Union Free School District
 Wappingers Central School District
 Webutuck Central School District
 Dutchess County BOCES

Private schools 

 Dutchess Day School
 Hawk Meadow Montessori School
 Holy Trinity School
 Millbrook School
 Oakwood Friends School
 Our Lady of Lourdes High School
 Poughkeepsie Day School 
 Randolph School
 St. Denis-St. Columba School
 St. Martin de Porres School
 St. Mary School - Fishkill 
 Trinity-Pawling School
 Tabernacle Christian Academy
 Upton Lake Christian School

Higher education 
 Bard College (Annandale-on-Hudson)
 Culinary Institute of America main campus (Hyde Park)
 Dutchess Community College (Poughkeepsie)
 Marist College (Poughkeepsie)
 Vassar College (Poughkeepsie)

Transportation

Roads

 Interstate 84 traverses the county in an east–west route cutting through the southwestern quadrant of the county before entering Putnam County. It is the only interstate highway in the county.
 US 9, the Taconic State Parkway (the only other limited-access road in the county besides I-84, although it still has some at-grade intersections), and NY 22 are the main north–south roads in the county. For much of its length the Taconic is paralleled by NY 82. NY 9G leaves US 9 in Poughkeepsie and parallels it north to the Columbia County line.
 US 44, NY 52, NY 55, and NY 199 are the other primary east–west roads in the county. NY 52 enters the county concurrent with I-84, leaves it at Fishkill but then follows it into Putnam County.

Crossings

Three spans cross the Hudson River, linking Dutchess with Orange, Ulster, and Greene Counties:

 The Newburgh-Beacon Bridge carries Interstate 84 and NY 52 between Fishkill/Beacon and Newburgh (Orange County). The westbound span opened in 1963 and the eastbound span opened in 1980.
 The Mid-Hudson Bridge carries US 44 and NY 55 between Poughkeepsie and Highland (Town of Lloyd, Ulster County)
 The Kingston-Rhinecliff Bridge carries NY 199 between Rhinebeck and Kingston (Ulster County)

Railroads
 
The Metro-North railroad provides a critical link to New York City for Dutchess County's commuting population. The Hudson Line and Amtrak run concurrently along the Hudson River, on the western edge of the county. The Hudson Line has stops at Breakneck Ridge, Beacon, and New Hamburg (a hamlet of the town of Poughkeepsie) before the Hudson Line terminates at Poughkeepsie. The tracks continue north of that point as Amtrak, with Poughkeepsie and Rhinecliff (a small hamlet in the Town of Rhinebeck) being stops along Amtrak's Empire Service.

The Harlem Line, on the eastern side of the county, has station stops in Pawling, along the Appalachian Trail, Wingdale, Dover Plains, and two stops in Wassaic (one along the Tenmile River and the other the namesake terminus of that line).

Buses and ferries

Public transportation in Dutchess County is handled by Dutchess County Public Transit, commonly called "the LOOP." Outside of the urbanized area of the county, most service is limited. Privately run lines connect Poughkeepsie to New Paltz and Beacon to Newburgh. Leprechaun Lines and Short Line Bus also operate some service through Poughkeepsie, Rhinebeck, and the southern part of the county.

NY Waterway operates the Newburgh–Beacon Ferry, which is located at the Beacon train station.

Air
General aviation facilities are located at Hudson Valley Regional Airport (formerly Dutchess County Airport), located in Wappinger and Sky Park Airport in Red Hook, New York. General commercial passenger service is provided by New York Stewart International Airport, which is located across the Hudson River in Newburgh.

Culture

Dutchess County holds an annual county fair. The County Chamber of Commerce holds an annual hot air balloon launch typically in the first week of July. The main launch sites are along the Hudson River. As many as 20 balloons participate in the event.

The Dutchess County Historical Society was formed in 1914 and is active in the preservation of a large collection at the 18th century Clinton House. The Society has published a yearbook since 1914 and presents up to four awards of merit in the field of Dutchess County history each year.

Media
Dutchess County has no locally based television stations. Its only news radio format station is WKIP (AM) of Poughkeepsie. WRHV is an NPR affiliated broadcasting out of Poughkeepsie. The country music format station, WRWB-FM, broadcasting across the Hudson River, can be reached in much of the county.

Poughkeepsie Journal is published in that city. Vassar Miscellany News, associated with Vassar College, is published weekly. Also published in the county is the Beacon Free Press/Southern Dutchess News.

Health 
The county is home to Northern Dutchess Hospital in Rhinebeck. MidHudson Regional Hospital (formerly St. Francis) and Vassar Brothers Medical Center are both in Poughkeepsie. The Castle Point Veterans Health Administration is in Wappinger.

On March 11, 2020, the county's first case of COVID-19 was confirmed. As of June 2021, there had been 29,483 cases and 445 deaths. There are under 100 active cases and 56.8% of residents received at least one vaccine dose.

Sports
The Hudson Valley Renegades are a minor league baseball team affiliated with the New York Yankees. The team is a member of the High-A East, and play at Dutchess Stadium in Fishkill.

The Hudson Valley Bears were one of four founding members of the Eastern Professional Hockey League (EPHL). They played their home games at the Mid-Hudson Civic Center in Poughkeepsie.

The Hudson Valley Hawks was a team in the former National Professional Basketball League. The team's home court was at Beacon High School, in Beacon.

See also

 List of counties in New York
 National Register of Historic Places listings in Dutchess County, New York
 Hudson Valley

Notes

References

Further reading
 MacCracken, Henry Noble. Old Dutchess Forever!, New York: Hastings House, ©1956. LC 56-12863
 Smith, James H. History of Dutchess County, New York, Syracuse, New York: 1882. Reprinted: Interlaken, New York: Heart of the Lakes Publishing.

External links

 Dutchess County official webpage
 Early history summary of Dutchess County
 

 
Poughkeepsie–Newburgh–Middletown metropolitan area
Counties in the New York metropolitan area
1713 establishments in the Province of New York
Populated places established in 1713
Mary of Modena